The Murray Community School District is a rural public school district headquartered in Murray, Iowa.

The district is mainly in western Clarke County, with smaller areas in Union and Decatur counties. The district serves the city of Murray, and surrounding rural areas.
The school's mascot is the Mustangs. Their colors are purple, gold and white.

Schools
The district operates two schools in a single facility at 216 Sherman Street in Murray:
Murray Elementary School
Murray High School

Murray High School

Athletics 
The Mustangs compete in the Bluegrass Conference, including the following sports:

Volleyball 
Football (8-man)
Basketball (boys and girls)
Wrestling (as East Union-Murray)
Track and Field (boys and girls)
Golf (girls, as East Union-Murray)
Baseball 
Softball

See also
List of school districts in Iowa
List of high schools in Iowa

References

External links
 Murray Community School District

School districts in Iowa
Education in Decatur County, Iowa
Education in Union County, Iowa
Education in Clarke County, Iowa